Breadcrumb Sins is an album by Jamie Saft which was released on the Tzadik label in 2002.

Reception

In his review for Allmusic, Stephen Cook notes that "Backed by a combo featuring guitar, percussion, vocals, and turntables, Saft commands the stage here as he plays myriad instruments on this, his second Tzadik release".

Track listing
All compositions by Jamie Saft
 "Agam Haeysh" – 4:30   
 "Vesamcheynu Dub" – 4:17   
 "Fratricide" – 5:03   
 "Chet" – 4:47   
 "Blood on the Door" – 7:18   
 "Aveira Dub" – 6:12   
 "Treyf" – 4:07   
 "T'Khelet" – 6:42   
 "Peaceful World" – 5:05

Personnel
Jamie Saft – piano, Hammond organ, synthesizer, electronics, steel guitar, dumbek, saz, dubs, turntables, percussion, vocals
Mr. Dorgon – turntables (track 7)
Rob Haggis – percussion (track 6)
Chris Kelly – guitar solo (track 3)
Rick Quinones – vocals, guitar, effects (track 3 & 9) 
Vanessa Saft (tracks 7 & 8), Antony (track 5) – vocals

References

Tzadik Records albums
Jamie Saft albums
2002 albums